The Special Service Medal was a decoration of South Vietnam which was issued between the years of 1950 and 1974.  The decoration was awarded to any military service member who performed an act of outstanding meritorious service to the Vietnamese State.  The Special Service Medal was also awarded to members of foreign militaries and was presented frequently to members of the United States Armed Forces during the years of the Vietnam War.

The U.S. military considered the Special Service Medal to be the equivalent of the Bronze Star.  When awarded to U.S. personnel, the decoration was permitted for wear on U.S. uniforms after all United States military awards.

In 1975, with the fall of Saigon, the South Vietnamese military effectively ceased to exist and the Special Service Medal became obsolete.  Today, it is only available by private purchase through military insignia dealers.

See also
Military awards and decorations of South Vietnam

References

External links
Military Orders, Decorations, and Medals of the Republic of Vietnam

Military awards and decorations of Vietnam